Munmyo (more specifically Seoul Munmyo or Seonggyungwan Munmyo) is Korea's primary temple of Confucius ("munmyo" is also the general Korean term for a temple of Confucius).  It is located in central Seoul, South Korea, on the campus of Sungkyunkwan University.

Munmyo houses a shrine to Confucius known as Daeseongjeon, or "Hall of Great Achievement." The main gate leading to the shrine Sinsammun, literally "Spirit Three Gate", is open only on special occasions such as Seokjeon Daeje. The central gate is reserved for the spirit of Confucius and his disciple, and no one else may enter through this gate.  Past this gate is the central path that leads to Daeseongjeon, and visitors may not cross this path, especially during a ceremony when the gates are open.  The courtyard is used for the Seokjeon Daeje ceremony.  Munmyo also contains two other halls (Dongmu and Seomu, east and west hall), two dormitories (Dongjae and Seojae, east and west dormitories), a Confucian lecture hall called Myeongnyundang, a library called Cheonggyeongdang, and Jinsasikdang which is the dining hall.

History

The Munmyo is based on Confucian practices from China, where Confucius and followers of his teachings were honored and venerated. Temples dedicated to Confucius and other disciples called "temples of Confucius" became widespread during the Tang dynasty. This idea was brought to Korea where it was adopted. The buildings of Munmyo were first constructed in 1398, but they were destroyed in a fire in 1400, and rebuilt in 1407. The temple was again destroyed during Japanese invasions of Korea in 1592–1598, and the Daeseongjeon was rebuilt in 1601, and Myeongnyundang in 1606 with funds raised by students of Sungkyunkwan. Repairs to the temple were conducted in 1869.

Apart from Confucius, the four closest associates of Confucius (Yan Hui, Zengzi, Zisi, Mencius), ten philosophers praised by Confucius, six Song dynasty neo-Confucians are also honoured in the temple. Also enshrined in the temple are 18 notable Korean confucians called the "Eighteen Sages of Korea" or the "Eighteen Confucian Scholars of the East", or Canonised Sages (配享先生). They are, in the chronological order of enshrinement: Choe Chiwon, Seol Chong, An Hyang, Jeong Mong-ju, Kim Gweong-pil, Jeong Yeo-chang, Jo Gwang-jo, Yi Eon-jeok, Yi Hwang, Jo Hun, Yi I, Seong Hon, Kim Jang-saeng, Song Si-yeol, Song Jun-gil, Pak Se-chae, Kim Inhu, and Kim Jip.

Present Day
A ritual Munmyo jerye or Seokjeon Daeje, which involves music and dance, is held there each year in the spring (April) and autumn (September); the ritual features ancient music of Chinese origin called Munmyo jeryeak, which is a form of aak. 

The musicians are provided by the National Gugak Center.  The instruments used include flutes (hun, so, and bamboo flutes), zithers (seul and geum), stone chimes (pyeongyeong), bronze bells (pyeonjong), various drums played with sticks, tiger-shaped wooden scraper (eo), wooden box (chuk), and wooden clappers (bak).

Munmyo is designated by the South Korean government as Historic Site No. 143.

See also
Temple of Confucius
Korean Confucianism
Confucius
Aak
Jongmyo
Sungkyunkwan
Sungkyunkwan University
Kongmiao, Beijing

References

External links
Sung Kyun Kwan University

Asian Historical Architecture: Munmyo Confucian Shrine
"Rare Confucian Musical Ritual at NCKTPA", by Kim Ju-young, from The Korea Times

Video
Munmyo jeryeak video

Korean Confucianism
14th-century establishments in Korea
1398 establishments in Asia
Confucian temples in Korea